Henry Powell (December 7, 1838 – April 9, 1902) was an American politician.

Born in Worcester, England, he moved to Newport, Wisconsin Territory in 1845 and then Mazomanie, Wisconsin in 1865. He served in the 1st Wisconsin Heavy Artillery Regiment during the American Civil War. He served as justice of the peace, in town government, and on the Dane County, Wisconsin Board of Supervisors and the chairman of the board. He served in Wisconsin State Assembly in 1887 as a Republican. He died in Mazomanie, Wisconsin.

References

External links

1828 births
1902 deaths
People from Mazomanie, Wisconsin
People of Wisconsin in the American Civil War
English emigrants to the United States
County supervisors in Wisconsin
People from Columbia County, Wisconsin
19th-century American politicians
Republican Party members of the Wisconsin State Assembly